Pre-Madonna (titled In the Beginning in European countries) is a collection of demos by American singer Madonna. It was released in 1997 by Stephen Bray, who was the producer of the songs when they were recorded, and was distributed by Soultone. Madonna met up with Bray, her former boyfriend, in 1980 when she was trying to establish her music career. She had left the band Breakfast Club and enlisted his help to further her career. Together they started writing songs and recorded them at New York's Music Building studio. The songs recorded at that time—seven of which were written solely by Madonna—were released in Pre-Madonna.

Although not authorized by Madonna, Bray decided to release Pre-Madonna by remixing some of the tracks, and keeping the others in their original form. Included were the demo versions of "Everybody" and "Burning Up" which Madonna used for her self-titled debut album. The album received mixed reviews, with some critics deeming the release as unnecessary, while others were delighted to hear Madonna's original recordings.

Background
In 1979, Madonna was trying to establish her career in the music industry. She was the drummer of a band called Breakfast Club, which was headed by the Gilroy brothers, Dan and Ed. After their lead female vocalist left, Madonna was given the role of the lead female singer. However, she wanted to be the only female voice of the band, and opposed against the introduction of another female vocalist, Angie Smith. This led to a dispute between Dan and her, which resulted in Madonna leaving the band. She then formed a new band called Madonna and The Sky, but that also faced a major problem within a few weeks when its principal drummer Mike Shenoy, who had a full-time job and a fiancé, decided to leave the band.

Undaunted by Shenoy's departure, Madonna partnered up with her Michigan boyfriend Stephen Bray. Bray and Madonna had met at the University of Michigan in 1976, where he was working as a waiter in a club at Ann Arbor. Bray used to take Madonna on the tours of his band; after their romance ended, they remained good friends. When Madonna telephoned Bray to come and join the band, he immediately accepted and joined as the drummer replacing Shenoy. Madonna's main focus now was to become a professional singer, and she asked Bray to help her achieve that. Together they started writing songs and recorded them under Gotham Records, in New York's rehearsal studio called the Music Building. The songs recorded included "Ain't No Big Deal", "Laugh to Keep from Crying", "Crimes of Passion" and "Stay". Bray was the producer of these recordings, along with some demos that Madonna had recorded, including "Everybody" and "Burning Up". The latter two songs were accepted for Madonna's self-titled debut album, in a reworked version; however the demos were left with Bray.

Composition

When Bray decided to release the demo tracks in an album, he remixed some of them for a more contemporary appeal. "Ain't No Big Deal" was re-recorded and released as the B-side to her singles "True Blue" and "Papa Don't Preach". The track features Madonna's typical high-pitched vocal timbre of that time, and talks about a carefree woman proclaiming her love. "Stay" and "Don't You Know" were combined into one song, "Stay", which was included on the Like a Virgin album. The songs use triple-rhythms and double-tracked vocals and includes a noise resembling someone slapping a microphone and a spoken sequence which fades away in the end. The 1981 versions of "Everybody", "Burning Up" and "Ain't No Big Deal" are the pure demo versions of officially released songs whose titles are tagged with the year in which they were recorded to differentiate them from the officially released versions.

According to Rikky Rooksby, author of The Complete Guide to the Music of Madonna, "Everybody" demo version is more or less same as the single version, without the synth grooves added in it. Similarly, the demo "Burning Up" does not contain the guitar riffs of the single version. Larry Flick from Billboard described "Crimes of Passion" as "disco-spiced". The song talks about how infidelity can actually set one free from a doomed relationship. Madonna's voice sounds fuller in the verses and chorus, but takes a higher pitch in the bridge. "Laugh to Keep from Crying" is a rock song, with 12-string Rickenbacker guitar played by Madonna herself. Madonna's voice sounds drunk and the drum machine backs her voice in the chorus. AllMusic compared her sound on the song to that of The Pretenders. According to Bray, "[Pre-Madonna] carve the dance sound of a generation and chronicle Madonna's first musical self-definition phase."

Release and reception
At the time the compilation was released, Madonna was riding a wave of publicity as a result of the film Evita and her pregnancy with daughter Lourdes. Bray said in an interview with Extra that Madonna would receive royalties for the release, and added "There's nothing in these tapes that would be embarrassing, and just hoping that she would like it as much as we do." In the European countries, the album was re-titled as In the Beginning, featuring different artwork, and a re-arranged track list.

Pre-Madonna received mixed reviews from critics. Mark Egan from Rocky Mountain News writes that "although the songs have soul in them, it's the delivery that lacks in Madonna's voice; you just feel that something is really missing." Mark Zug from Chicago Tribune commented that "the demos on Pre-Madonna are a delight to listen to. To all the Madonna fans, this is one album worth collecting and replaying." Jasmine Temple from Lexington Herald-Leader calls the album, "a gloriously voyeuristic—and unauthorized—glimpse at Madonna's past, the woman she was then. You can actually sense the development of the icon she is today from the songs." Robin DeRosa from USA Today was disappointed with the release, saying that "it feels forced. This release is as unneeded as the hoopla surrounding Madonna's new born. Every artist has demo recordings in their early phases of career and they are generally not good. This one is not different." After Madonna was inducted into the Rock and Roll Hall of Fame in 2008, Tony Sclafani from MSNBC noted that none of Madonna's songs were in the rock music genre, "but all use rock as a jumping off point. Audible evidence of Madonna's rock roots can be found on the collection of early demos Pre-Madonna."

Track listing
All tracks written by Madonna except "Ain't No Big Deal" by Stephen Bray.

Personnel
Credits and personnel adapted from In the Beginning liner notes.

Madonna – vocals, writer, guitar, drums
Stephen Bray – writer, producer, guitar, drums, keyboard
Tony Shepperd – producer, mixing
Nick Matzorkis – executive producer
Robert Rich – executive producer
Paul Pesco – guitar
Jamie Muhoberac – keyboard
Kevin Gray – audio mastering
Viveka Davis – booklet photography
Dr. KEB Rhythm – drum programming

References

Bibliography

External links
 

1997 albums
Demo albums
Madonna compilation albums
Unauthorized albums